Metacrambus is a genus of moths of the family Crambidae.

Species
Metacrambus carectellus (Zeller, 1847)
Metacrambus deprinsi Ganev, 1990
Metacrambus jugaraicae Bleszynski, 1965
Metacrambus kurdistanellus (Amsel, 1959)
Metacrambus marabut Bleszynski, 1965
Metacrambus pallidellus (Duponchel, 1836)
Metacrambus salahinellus (Chrétien, 1917)

References

Natural History Museum Lepidoptera genus database

Crambinae
Crambidae genera
Taxa named by Stanisław Błeszyński